Ben Lemon is an American actor. He has worked in film and television since 1989. His most notable role may be in the Star Trek: The Next Generation episode "Violations" as "Jev". His other TV appearances include 90210 (2013), House M.D. (2011), Desperate Housewives (2010), The Practice (1997), and Married... With Children (1990) among others.

Filmography
Die Hard 2 (1990) - Sergeant (Blue Light Team)
Hot Shots! Part Deux (1993) - Team 2 Leader
Weekend at Bernie's II (1993) - New York Cop #2
Liar Liar (1997) - Randy
Counting for Thunder (2015) - Dr. Jim

External links

1955 births
American male film actors
American male television actors
Living people
People from Tarrytown, New York